Rønnaug Kleiva (born 30 November 1951) is a Norwegian poet, writer of short stories and author of children's literature. She received the Norwegian Critics Prize for Best children's book in 1997 for the children's book Ikkje gløym å klappe katten.

References

Norwegian women short story writers
Norwegian children's writers
Norwegian Critics Prize for Literature winners
1951 births
Living people
Norwegian women poets
Norwegian women children's writers